Ramon Olorunwa Abbas  (born 11 October 1982), commonly known as Hushpuppi, Hush, or Ray Hushpuppi is a Nigerian former Instagram influencer and convicted felon. He was sentenced in the United States to 11 years for conspiracy to launder money obtained from business email compromise frauds and other scams, including schemes that defrauded a US law firm of about $40 million, illegally transferred $14.7 million from a foreign financial institution, and targeted to steal $124 million from an English Premier League club.

Until his arrest by the Dubai Police in June 2020 and subsequent extradition to the United States, Abbas posted pictures and videos of his lavish spending on exotic cars, watches, designer clothes, bags from expensive brands like Gucci, Fendi, and Louis Vuitton and of himself boarding helicopters, with celebrities, footballers, and Nigerian politicians or while on charter jets. He claimed to be a real estate developer. He also holds a passport from St Kitts and Nevis, which was fraudulently obtained through a sham marriage to a St. Kitts and Nevis citizen.

On the night his apartment at the Palazzo Versace was raided in an operation code-named Fox Hunt 2, Abbas was arrested alongside eleven others in six simultaneous raids. Detectives seized more than 150 million dirham (about $40 million) in cash, 13 luxury cars worth Dh 25 million ($7M), 21 laptops, 47 smartphones, 15 memory storage devices, five external hard drives and 800,000 emails of potential victims alongside suitcases full of cash. The arrest was part of an FBI investigation that indicted him as being a "key player" in a transnational cybercrime network that provided "safe havens for stolen money around the world."

Early life 
Many news platforms have reported that Abbas was once a second-hand clothes seller in Lagos. Abbas prided himself on his humble beginnings. Hushpuppi's close associate, Mompha once revealed that his dad is still a cab driver in Lagos.
Citing interviews with old neighbours of Abbas, TheCable.ng reported that Abbas had a reputation as a "Yahoo Yahoo boy" a local name for a cybercriminal, was not supported by his mother, had not lifted any of his old friends from poverty, and had ignored multiple warnings regarding his lifestyle.

He is the subject of a 2017 song "Telli Person" by Nigerian singer Timaya featuring Olamide and Phyno, with whom he had a long-running feud. The song contained lyrics directed toward Abbas indirectly accusing him of being a swindler and lavishing his money on designer clothes instead of investing in profitable ventures and warning him that he would soon be caught by authorities. Many viewed the song as a prophetic warning that was fulfilled with his arrest.

Fraud allegations 
Upon his arrival in the United States on 3 July 2020, he was accused of conspiring to launder 'hundreds of millions of dollars'.

The affidavit also accused Abbas and a co-conspirator of conspiring to launder funds intended to be stolen through fraudulent wire transfers from a 'foreign financial institution' in which fraudulent wire transfers, totalling approximately US$14.7 million, were sent to bank accounts around the world in February 2019. Though the affidavit did not name any bank, according to Forbes, the date of the attack and amount mentioned in the affidavit matched that of the attack on Malta's Bank of Valletta in February 2019. In February 2019, $14.7 million was transferred out of the bank through false international transactions to accounts in the United States, the United Kingdom, Czech Republic, and Hong Kong. The attack was of such seriousness in Malta that then Prime Minister Joseph Muscat was forced to address parliament. Multiple sources in Malta including Times of Malta and Malta Today also repeated Forbes's claims that Hushpuppi could have been behind the attack. According to the affidavit Abbas had provided a co-conspirator with two bank accounts in Europe anticipating the receipt of $5.6 million each of the fraudulently obtained funds. U.S. authorities also accused him of aiding North Korean hackers in money laundering.

According to the affidavit other communications between Abbas and one of his co-conspirators indicated that the two had conspired to "launder tens, and at times hundreds, of millions of dollars that were proceeds of other fraudulent schemes and computer intrusions, including a fraudulent scheme to steal £100 million ($124 million) from an English Premier League football club.

Abbas is also accused of committing fraud in Nigeria as he is also wanted by Nigeria's financial crime police, the Economic and Financial Crimes Commission.

A request for his bail and the chance to stay with his girlfriend's uncle in Homewood, Illinois, was denied on the grounds that he presented a risk of non-appearance. At Abbas' detention hearing, his lawyer, Pissetzky told the court that his client posed no flight risk because of the damage it would do to his credibility online, adding, "He is loved and respected. He is a celebrity. He would not want to ruin his credibility and status rather than stay here and face these allegations." Prosecutors cited his "significant" financial assets, "deep ties to foreign countries" and a lack of ties to the United States. If convicted of conspiracy to engage in money laundering, Abbas would face a statutory maximum sentence of 15 years in federal prison, perhaps even 20 years, after which he will be deported to his home country Nigeria.

An article in Bloomberg Businessweek details his actions leading to his arrest, incarceration, and a trial on 27 July 2021, in Los Angeles.  "Authorities say, Ramon Abbas, aka Hushpuppi, perfected a simple internet scam and laundered millions of dollars. His past says a lot about digital swagger and the kinds of stories that get told online."

On 28 July 2021, Hushpuppi pleaded guilty to money laundering and also identified a Deputy Commissioner of Police in Nigeria, Abba Kyari, as an accomplice in his $1.1 million scam deal. The following day, a US Court granted an FBI warrant to arrest Abba Kyari. The Police chief was further implicated after his conversation with Hushpuppi was released.

Sentencing 

In a final appeal to Judge Otis Wright ahead of his scheduled sentencing on 19 September 2022, Hushpuppi wrote a personal letter to the court narrating his source of wealth, criminal adventure and regrets. He apologised to his family members for bringing them shame while commending the FBI for doing a thorough job while bringing him to justice.

On 19 September 2022, Judge Otis Wright delayed Hushpuppi's sentencing to 3 November 2022. The Judge had initially rejected the plea of the defendant's motion for a delay of judgement. On 8 November 2022, Hushpuppi was sentenced to over 11 years (135 months) in a federal prison.

Public opinion on social media 

Public opinion on social media offers opportunities to explore contestations between diverse viewpoints. A recent study demonstrates that many people on Twitter trivialize the fraudulent actions of online fraudsters such as Hushpuppi. Specifically, Twitter responses (from Nigerians in Nigeria and abroad) innovatively merge the names of a former chairman of the Economic and Financial Crimes Commission (Mr. Ibrahim Magu accused of fraudulent and corrupt practices) and Hushpuppi as "Hush Ibrahim," "Hush Magu," and "Puppi Magu." Creating these phrases is essential linguistic maneuvering, enabling a sharp comparison of the similarities between Hushpuppi, a fraudster, popularly known as an offender, and a prominent authority representative, uncritically seen as a law-abiding citizen.

Therefore, the linguistic juxtapositions of "Hushpuppi" and "Mr. Ibrahim Magu" by Twitter users serve as exonerative social media devices more broadly and have real-life consequences. By implication, if what was once morally condemnable becomes a source of valuation, it becomes a source of valuation in its consequences in society. The manifestation of linguistic maneuvering, "advantageous comparison" as a preferred technique of choice by Twitter users, exposes their total trivialization of online fraudsters' economic actions, e.g., Huspuppi. The study argues that this type of linguistic manipulation voiced as public opinion on Twitter denies the sufferings of victims of online fraud. The study concludes that the process by which some actions are interpreted as a crime compared to others is a moral enterprise.

Related to the above, another study on public opinion on Twitter revealed significant discrepancies between Nigeria's northern and southern regions regarding online fraudsters' arrests, convictions, and sentencing. Specifically, the study showed that the criminalization of people indigenous to southern Nigeria, such as Hushpuppi, differs substantially from that of Northerners, suggesting that more Southerners are more implicated in internet fraud than Northerners. The study concludes that colonial legacies contributed to the North-South divide regarding online fraud patterns in Nigeria.

In the media 

In November 2022, Curtis James Jackson III, a.k.a, 50 Cents, announced his plan on Instagram to shoot a television series on the life of Hushpuppi, including his fraudulent career path and sentencing. A short documentary about the life of Hushpuppi till his arrest has been released by both Bloomberg and BBC Africa.

References 

1982 births
Living people
Businesspeople from Lagos State
Nigerian fraudsters
Nigerian expatriates in the United Arab Emirates
Nigerian money launderers